Roger L. Geiger (born 1943) is an American scholar of higher education in the United States. He is Distinguished Professor of Higher Education Emeritus at Pennsylvania State University.

Education and career
Geiger graduated from the University of Michigan with a Bachelor of Arts with a major in English in 1964, an Master of Arts in history in 1966, and a Doctor of Philosophy in history in 1972.

He was an instructor in history at Northern Michigan University from 1966 to 1968 and at the University of Michigan from 1972 to 1974. From 1974 to 1987 he was employed at Yale University's Institution for Social and Policy Studies. He joined the faculty of Pennsylvania State University in 1987.

Books
  (1st edition, 1986, Oxford University Press)
  (1st edition, 1993, Oxford University Press)
 
 as editor with Carol Colbeck, Roger L. Williams, and Christian K. Anderson: 
 with Creso M. Sá: 
 
 as editor: 
 as editor with Nathan M. Sorber and Christian K. Anderson:

References

 

Pennsylvania State University faculty
1943 births
Living people
Place of birth missing (living people)
University of Michigan alumni

External Links
"Roger's Notes": https://sites.psu.edu/rogerlgeiger/